Nigel Kevin Watts (21 October 1919 – February 17, 1995) was an Australian rugby league footballer who played in the 1940s.

Playing career
Watts was a schoolboy rugby union start from St. Josephs College, who went on to star for the Eastern Suburbs Rugby Union club before embarking on a brief rugby league career at St. George during World War II.  As he had never played Rugby League before, the residential-rule did not apply to Watts, who was a resident of Bondi at the time. Watts was in the Australian Army during his time at the Saints, although after he was discharged from the Army, he moved to a captain/coach role in the Illawarra competition in 1946. He represented a combined South Coast Division representative team that defeated the touring Great Britain national rugby league team 15–12 at Wollongong, New South Wales on 2 June 1946.

Death
Watts died in Sydney on 17 February 1995

References

St. George Dragons players
1919 births
1995 deaths
Rugby league players from Sydney
Country New South Wales rugby league team players
Rugby league centres
Australian military personnel of World War II
Australian rugby league players